WRGS (1370 AM, "Hometown Radio") is a radio station broadcasting a southern gospel and classic country music format. Licensed to Rogersville, Tennessee, United States, the station is currently owned by WRGS, Inc .

References

External links
 

Classic country radio stations in the United States
RGS
Rogersville, Tennessee
Radio stations established in 1954
1954 establishments in Tennessee